Campylopus pyriformis is a species of moss belonging to the family Dicranaceae. It has a cosmopolitan distribution.

References

Dicranales